Roose is a railway station on the Furness Line, which runs between  and . It is owned by Network Rail and managed by Northern Trains.

Facilities
Facilities here are very basic. The station is unstaffed and there are no permanent buildings present, other than standard shelters. Travellers towards Lancaster and Manchester benefit from a ticket vending and collection machine, though travellers for Barrow and the Cumbrian Coast are urged to buy tickets in advance or from the Northern Railway App to avoid penalty fares.   As of Spring 2021, train running information is provided by digital display, telephone and timetable posters.  Step-free access to the platforms is available via a ramp on the south side from the nearby road bridge that also acts as the link between the two and directly from the adjacent road on the northbound side.

Services

A similar service operates on Sundays.

References

External links 

 
 

Furness
Buildings and structures in Barrow-in-Furness
Transport in Barrow-in-Furness
Railway stations in Cumbria
DfT Category F2 stations
Former Furness Railway stations
Railway stations in Great Britain opened in 1858
Northern franchise railway stations